Streptomyces piniterrae is a bacterium species from the genus of Streptomyces which has been isolated from rhizosphereic soil of the tree Pinus yunnanensis. Streptomyces piniterrae produces heliquinomycin and 9'-methoxy-heliquinomycin.

See also 
 List of Streptomyces species

References 

piniterrae
Bacteria described in 2020